The LNER Class Y1 was a class of 0-4-0 geared steam locomotives built by Sentinel Waggon Works for the London and North Eastern Railway and introduced in 1925.  They passed into British Railways ownership in 1948 and were numbered 68130-68153  but 68134 was withdrawn almost immediately and may not have carried its BR number.

Power unit

The superheated vertical water-tube boiler and the engine were similar to those used in Sentinel steam wagons.  There were variations within the class as regards boiler size and fuel capacity and these were denoted by sub-classes Y1/1 to Y1/4.

The engines had poppet valves and reversing was by sliding camshaft.  The advantage of the water-tube boiler was that steam could be raised much more quickly than with a conventional fire-tube boiler.

Transmission
Final drive to the wheels was by sprocket chain.  Some engines had a gear ratio of 11:25 and some 9:25.  Tractive effort was:
 Ratio 11:25, 7,260 lbf (68130-68142 and 68152-68153)
 Ratio 9:25, 8,870 lbf (68143-68151)

Sub-classes
 Y1/1, 68130-68135 and 68152 (total 7) 
 Y1/2, 68137, 68138, 68140-68151, 68153 (total 15) 
 Y1/3, 68139 (total 1) 
 Y1/4, 68136 (total 1) 

There is disagreement between sources.  According to LNER Encyclopedia  there were six Y1/1s and sixteen Y1/2s.

Preservation

 Class Y1 number 68153 is preserved on the Middleton Railway.

References

External links
 Middleton Railway Stock List Sentinel

Sentinel locomotives
Y01
0-4-0T locomotives
Railway locomotives introduced in 1925
Standard gauge steam locomotives of Great Britain

Shunting locomotives